Justino is a name which is used as both a given name and a surname. Notable people with the name include:

Given name 
Justino de Azcárate (1903–1989), Spanish lawyer and politician
Justino Díaz (born 1940), Puerto Rican operatic bass-baritone
Justino Orona Madrigal, Saint of the Cristero War
Justino Romea, Filipino composer, writer, director, musical arranger, poet and journalist

Middle name 
Vinicius Justino Calamari (born 1988), Brazilian footballer
João Justino Amaral dos Santos (born 1954), former football (soccer) player
Valcemar Justino da Silva (born 1968), Brazilian professional racing cyclist

Surname 
Fabio Augusto Justino (born 1974), former Brazilian football player
Hélio Justino (born 1972), Brazilian handball player
Jorge Luiz Alves Justino (born 1982), Brazilian central defender

See also
Major Justino Mariño Cuesto Air Base (ICAO: SKMA), Colombian military base in Madrid, Cundinamarca, Colombia
Justin (disambiguation)
Justina (disambiguation)
Justine (disambiguation)
Justinus (disambiguation)

Spanish masculine given names
Spanish-language surnames